The 10th Brant Dragoons was a cavalry regiment of the Non-Permanent Active Militia of the Canadian Militia (now the Canadian Army). First raised in 1909 as the 25th Brant Dragoons, the regiment was redesignated in 1921 as the 10th Brant Dragoons. In 1936, the regiment was amalgamated with the 2nd Dragoons to form the 2nd/10th Dragoons now part of the 57th Field Artillery Regiment (2nd/10th Dragoons), RCA (currently on the Supplementary Order of Battle).

Lineage

10th Brant Dragoons 

 Originated on 1 April 1909, in Brantford, Ontario, as the 25th Brant Dragoons.
 Redesignated on 15 March 1920, as the 10th Brant Dragoons.
 Amalgamated on 15 December 1936, with the 2nd Dragoons and redesignated as the 2nd/10th Dragoons.

Alliances 

  - 6th (Inniskilling) Dragoons (Until 1922)
  - 5th Royal Inniskilling Dragoon Guards (1922–1936)

Notable members 

 Lieutenant-Colonel Henry Cockshutt
 Colonel John Henry Fisher

Notes

References 
 G. Michael Kirby, Rounds Complete, A History of the 57th Artillery Regiment (2nd/10th Dragoons) RCA, published by The Haunted Press, Niagara Falls, Ontario (1997)

Dragoon regiments of Canada
Military units and formations of Ontario
Military units and formations disestablished in 1936